Megachile franki is a species of bee in the family Megachilidae. It was described by Friese in 1920.

References

Franki
Insects described in 1920